Leszek Marek Długosz (born 18 June 1941 in Zaklików) is a Polish actor, poet, writer and composer. For many years he has been a member of cabaret "Piwnica pod Baranami", one of the most famous cabarets during the times of People's Republic of Poland.

Leszek Długosz studied at the Jagiellonian University (Uniwersytet Jagielloński) in Kraków (major in Polish studies) and Polish Higher School of Theater (Polska Wyższa Szkoła Teatralna) (major in acting). He has studied music since childhood and started his public performances at the Jagiellonian University’s Theater Hefajstos. In 1963 he won the Student's Song Competition (Festiwal Piosenki Studenckiej) in Kraków, and a year later he joined the cabaret "Piwnica Pod Baranami". His debut as a poet took place in 1973 with the publication of Lekcje Rytmiki. In 1978 he began a career of solo performances. He has since published many poetry and lyrics books, and has issued several CDs. He is the leader of an informal Kraków Poetic Club. He has performed around the world.

Honours 

 Silver Medal for Merit to Culture – Gloria Artis (2006)
 Commander's Cross of the Order of Polonia Restituta (2016)

References

External links 

 Short bio in English
 Gallery of photos
 Gallery of CDs
 Leszek Długosz Discography 

1941 births
Living people
Jagiellonian University alumni
Sung poetry of Poland
Polish male actors
Polish composers
Polish male writers
Polish poets
Recipients of the Silver Medal for Merit to Culture – Gloria Artis
Commanders of the Order of Polonia Restituta
People from Stalowa Wola County